Castilleja pilosa is a species of Indian paintbrush known by the common name parrothead Indian paintbrush. It is native to the western United States from California to Wyoming, where it grows in mountain and plateau habitat across the Great Basin and surrounding regions. It is known from sagebrush scrub to high mountains in alpine climates.

Description
This wildflower is a perennial herb growing upright or along the ground with hairy stems up to about 35 centimeters long. It is quite variable in appearance. The inflorescence is made up of layers of greenish, purplish, or pink bracts sometimes edged in white. Between the bracts bloom the pouched yellow-green flowers with protruding stigmas.

Varieties
There are several varieties of this species:
C. p. var. longispica (longspike Indian paintbrush) - limited to Idaho, Montana, and Wyoming
C. p. var. pilosa - limited to California, Oregon, and Nevada
C. p. var. steenensis  (Steens Indian paintbrush) - endemic to Oregon

External links
Jepson Manual Treatment: Castilleja pilosa
Castilleja pilosa - UC Photos gallery

pilosa
Flora of California
Flora of Idaho
Flora of Oregon
Flora of Nevada
Flora of Montana
Flora of Wyoming
Flora of the Cascade Range
Flora of the Great Basin
Flora of the Sierra Nevada (United States)
Plants described in 1871
Flora without expected TNC conservation status